Elections of police and crime commissioners in England and Wales were held on 6 May 2021, on the same day as the Senedd election in Wales and the local elections in England. This was the third time police and crime commissioner elections have been held (the two previous occasions were in 2012 and 2016). The elections were originally due to take place in May 2020 but were postponed by 12 months in view of the COVID-19 pandemic. Turnout was an average of 33.2% across the elections, with Wales having much higher turnout.

The criminal justice system and the legal jurisdiction of England and Wales are reserved (non-devolved) matters, which fall under the control of the UK parliament and government at Westminster. The criminal justice systems of Scotland and Northern Ireland are devolved.

Background 

Police and crime commissioners (PCCs) are elected representatives with responsibility for policing in each police area in England and Wales. Each police area—with the exception of Greater London and Greater Manchester, where the directly elected mayor is the policing authority instead—elects a commissioner every four years.

Police and Crime Commissioner elections use the supplementary vote system.

This was the third set of police and crime commissioner elections to be held. The role was created by the Police Reform and Social Responsibility Act 2011 and the first first elections were held in November 2012.

The Policing and Crime Act 2017, which amended the 2011 Act, enabled PCCs to take over governance of the local fire and rescue service. PCCs who have taken on these repoonsibilities are known as Police Fire and Crime Commissioners (PFCCs). There are currently four PFCCs:

Staffordshire (Created 1 August 2018.)
Essex (Created 1 October 2018.)
Northamptonshire (Created 15 November 2018.)
North Yorkshire (Created 1 January 2019.)

Postponement to 2021 
Owing to the COVID-19 pandemic, the elections due to be held in May 2020 were delayed until May 2021; this applied to the PCC elections as well as those for local authorities and elected mayors. The postponement was implemented by the Coronavirus Act 2020 which was enacted on 25 March 2020.

The act stipulates that the postponement is to be ignored in determining the years in which subsequent elections are to be held, thus the commissioners elected in 2021 will be in office for three years, not the usual four.

The office of West Yorkshire police and crime commissioner is abolished on the date of these elections, as the role is taken up by the office of the newly elected mayor of the West Yorkshire Combined Authority.

Police and crime commissioners not standing for re-election 
Ron Hogg, the Labour PCC for Durham since 2012, died in office. 
The following PCCs chose not to stand for re-election:
Ray Bisby, Conservative acting Cambridgeshire Police and Crime Commissioner since 2019.
Barry Coppinger, Labour Cleveland Police and Crime Commissioner since 2012.
 Matthew Ellis, Conservative Staffordshire Police and Crime Commissioner since 2012
Kathryn Holloway, Conservative Bedfordshire Police and Crime Commissioner since 2016.
 David Jamieson, Labour West Midlands Police and Crime Commissioner since 2014.
Arfon Jones, Plaid Cymru North Wales Police and Crime Commissioner since 2016.
Angus Macpherson, Conservative Wiltshire Police and Crime Commissioner since 2012.
Sue Mountstevens, Independent Avon and Somerset Police and Crime Commissioner since 2012.
Julia Mulligan, Conservative North Yorkshire Police and Crime Commissioner since 2012.
Anthony Stansfeld, Conservative Thames Valley Police and Crime Commissioner since 2012.
Martyn Underhill, Independent Dorset Police and Crime Commissioner since 2012.

England 

Incumbent police and crime commissioners are marked with an asterisk (*).

Avon and Somerset Police

Bedfordshire Police

Cambridgeshire Constabulary

Cheshire Constabulary

Cleveland Police 

Paul Williams initially planned to stand for the Labour Party, but he was selected as the party's candidate for the Hartlepool parliamentary constituency by-election that was on the same day as the PCC elections, and therefore withdrew.

Cumbria Constabulary

Derbyshire Constabulary

Devon and Cornwall Police

Dorset Police 

An independent candidate, Dan Hardy, originally withdrew from the election after the postponement of the 2020 election meant he was unable to financially continue his campaign. However, in March 2021 he announced he was standing again for election.

Durham Constabulary

Essex Police

Gloucestershire Constabulary

Hampshire Constabulary

Hertfordshire Constabulary

Humberside Police

Kent Police

Lancashire Constabulary

Leicestershire Police

Lincolnshire Police

Merseyside Police

Norfolk Constabulary

Northamptonshire Police

Northumbria Police

North Yorkshire Police

Nottinghamshire Police

South Yorkshire Police

Staffordshire Police

Suffolk Constabulary

Surrey Police

Sussex Police

Thames Valley Police

Warwickshire Police

West Mercia Police

West Midlands Police

Wiltshire Police 

The Conservative candidate, Jonathon Seed, withdrew on 9 May in the interval between the vote and the count, due to a conviction in 1993 for a 1992 drink driving offence. ITV News had been investigating Seed's background prior to the election after they were told there was something in his past that would prevent him from taking up the position of police and crime commissioner if he was elected; Seed and his campaign team declined to comment. Seed said he had declared the driving conviction to the Conservative party in his applications for his candidature, saying: "To the best of my knowledge and belief when I applied for, and became the Police and Crime Commissioner candidate for the Conservative Party in Wiltshire and Swindon, I was an eligible candidate. I have declared my thirty-year-old driving conviction to the Party in my applications both to be a Parliamentary candidate and more recently a PCC candidate".

Candidates are required to sign a declaration which reads "I am aware of the provisions of the Police Reform and Social Responsibility Act 2011 and to the best of my knowledge and belief I am not disqualified from election as Police and Crime Commissioner." Guidance published by the Electoral Commission says PCC candidates cannot seek election if they have been convicted of an offence punishable with a prison sentence, this includes spent convictions and those where a prison sentence was not given.

Counting of votes went ahead, and Seed won most votes on the second round.  Wiltshire Police asked Thames Valley Police to investigate the candidacy, "to ensure independent oversight and to remove any potential conflict of interest". Further investigation by ITV News found a second imprisonable offence arising from the 1992 incident: failure to stop after causing damage to a motor vehicle. Seed was subsequently charged with making a false declaration in the nomination papers, a charge he denied at Oxford Crown Court in November. He was due to stand trial in July 2022, but in June the Crown Prosecution Service dropped the charges after a pre-trial review on the grounds of insufficient evidence.

The post fell vacant when Seed did not deliver acceptance of the office, and a by-election to fill the vacancy was held on 19 August 2021. Legislation states that the office becomes vacant two months after a person elected to the office fails to deliver their acceptance, and requires an election to be held within the subsequent 35 days.

The re-run was won by Conservative candidate Philip Wilkinson.

August 2021 re-run

Wales 

Incumbent police and crime commissioners are marked with an asterisk (*).

Dyfed-Powys Police

Gwent Police

North Wales Police

South Wales Police

References

2021 elections in the United Kingdom
Police and crime commissioner
2021
Police and crime commissioner elections
Police and crime commissioner elections
2020s elections in Wales
Police and crime commissioner elections
England and Wales police and crime commissioner elections 2021